Death's Shadow is the seventh book in Darren Shan's The Demonata series, released 1 May 2008.

Darren Shan has stated that he originally planned for the book to be called S.S Demonic, but that the title was vetoed by his editor due to its similarity to the previous book in the series, Demon Apocalypse.

It is published in the United Kingdom and the United States.

Plot

The book starts with the recollections of Beranabus. In this we learn his mother was a woman named Brigitta. When she was sixteen she was about to marry a prince. But the prince had angered a powerful priestess and for revenge she summoned a demon who kidnapped her. Months later she was sent back by the demon pregnant with his offspring. The prince calls in a favor from King Minos (placing these events in roughly 1500 BCE) and she was brought to the labyrinth of Daedalus to be slaughtered by the Minotaur. This happened after she gave birth and named her son Beranabus. The Minotaur tried to kill him but the baby was unafraid and had a special way with animals. The Minotaur smiled and decided to take care of it and fed it with its mother's blood. Many years later Theseus came to the labyrinth to slay the Minotaur which he did. Then he discovered the child which looked about six or seven to him, he tries to get him to leave with him, but becomes afraid of his yellow eyes so he leaves telling the people he respected the minotaur too much to sever his head, for Beranabus prevented him from doing so. He was left in the darkness to perish, but he would become the greatest hero of the human race that ever was.

We then learn how Bec is getting used to being alive again in the future and how life has been before she became trapped in the cave, while she was in the cave and how now afterwards she has learned to access Bill-E's memories in order to make sense of this strange new world. Six months have passed since they prevented the apocalypse and her life hasn't become easier for she made the mistake of telling Dervish about being able to access Bill-E's memories, thoughts and feelings and he has turned her in some kind of medium. For weeks she is forced to recount all kinds of things about Bill-E's life to him. She also reveals she has gained the ability to absorbs people's memories and feelings whenever she is touching them. Luckily Meera has been visiting, which makes her life a bit better. She tries to avoid physical contact with everyone. Then one day while out on the grounds an angry Reni confronts her asking about Grubbs and Bill-E, she learn that Reni feels guilty about her brother's Loch's death after touching her. She then freaks Reni out by talking about her deepest feelings. Meera comes to visit again Bec, tries to duck before Meera hugs her, but fails and absorbs some of her innermost memories. Meanwhile, Dervish comes downstairs to find Meera. Delighted to see Meera, he invites her upstairs to his study so they could talk business. Meera refuses saying that they have nothing to hide from Bec. Then out of nowhere, Meera suggests they have a "girls' night' to get to know each other a little better. As Meera starts to ask how things have been going with Dervish, knowing she can't hide anything from Meera considering she is the only one she can actually open up to, she starts explaining how Dervish only uses her for Bill-E. What Dervish doesn't understand is that she is not Bill-E. She can't just waste her life recalling Bill-E's thoughts, emotions, and memories. Meera jolts right up and tells Bec she would never have any man treat her like that, especially someone like Dervish whom she adores. She gets Bec to confront Dervish immediately, which she does, after talking everything out, they are about to hug but then Meera bursts through the door and says that there are three werewolves that broke into their house. Bec, Dervish and Meera retreat to the magically defended study. Trapped, they try an obvious escape route outside, but discover there are gunmen marking the house. However, Dervish reveals that he has two escape routes. When one fails they decide to use the other and after a tussle with the werewolves, they end up at the secret cellar. Once there Dervish has a heart attack and Meera calls the Disciples, but only Shark and Sharmila are available. Bec reveals to her she can absorb memories from people by touching them and reveals the attack came from the Lambs. By the time Shark and Sharmila arrive, the werewolves and the mysterious human gunmen have disappeared. Dervish is taken to the hospital while Shark and Meera go off to search for Beranabus to bring him to their aid. For they might have been after Bec.

We get more recollections of Beranabus. He easily found his way out of the labyrinth, but the light hurt his eyes. So he travelled by night, he was scatterbrained but he had a gift to tame any wild beast and find friendship everywhere. He goes from place to place until one day he sees a small village being attacked by an octopean demon. Interested he follows it through a window ending up in the Demonata universe. He went from realm to realm, taming many demons he came across and running away from those he couldn't with incredible speed. He eventually winds up back on earth and as the window disappears he becomes trapped there. He travelled all across the world trying to find an open window. He finds himself in Ireland while a tunnel is opened with demons pouring through, as he goes from place to place admiring the carnage he starts to feel unease. Drust finds him and Beranabus realizes Drust is looking for the tunnel to the Demonata universe just like him. He allows Drust to alter his brain and use him to find a group of people to help them get there. He recruits Bec and her people and they travel towards the tunnel. He falls in love with Bec and after losing her, he puts his demonic interests behind him.

Dervish is in the hospital, hooked up to all kinds of machines, because he is rich he has his own room and there are guards on the same floor. On the roof, Bec feels demons entering the hospital and she warns the other per walkie-talkie. They take Dervish out of his room and up towards the roof, where the guards have arranged for a helicopter to take them away. But before it can land it is attacked and a horribly mutated Juni Swan is seen leading the demons. The demons overcome Sharmilla and start eating her legs. Bec briefly fights Juni, but due to the magic Dervish recovers and hurls an attack at her. They go down again, but Bec convinces the other to go to the maternity ward to save the babies. They do so and while fighting here another window opens up and Beranabus, Kernel, Shark, Meera and Grubbs show up. The demons retreat as their window closes and the rest of the demons are picked off by Shark, Kernel and Meera. After the demons are dealt with a huge evacuation is taking place and everyone gathers on the roof to discuss what to do next and everything that happened, they decide to split up again. Beranabus will take Sharmilla and Dervish into the Demonata universe for it is their only chance at survival and Grubbs, Shark and Meera will go after the Lambs, while Kernel and Bec will stick with Beranabus. The five of them end up in an abandoned universe that has a strange oasis of bone trees and a conscious well. Here legs are fashioned for Sharmilla who eventually comes to and Dervish is thought by Bec how to keep his heart going. Kernel, now with new demonic eyes can see patches of light he didn't see before and which he can't control. He also can keep tabs on multiple people across dimensions. He keeps a track on Juni, then when she leaves Lord Loss's realm they open a portal to her, and after finding out it is a place full of magic all of them move in after her.

We get the final recollections of Beranabus. After losing Bec, he goes vigil in the cave for several months. But then after kissing the ground he leaves it never to return. He had planned to retrace his step, which forced him to think ahead, something which until this point was alien to him. Also him having been with Bec opened up new pathways in his brain. Then when he got to the shore he tried to commit suicide only to be saved by the Old Creatures. They told him he could see Bec again and gave him the will to live on, they then spent over a century teaching him how to speak and reason. They encourage his hatred of demons, teach him how to open windows and send him on missions to kill demons. Then he goes on a mission himself, until one day he returns to their cave to find all of them gone. He tracks one down in Newgrange who tells them it is their time to move on and humanity has to fend for itself with him as their guardian. It then explains about the Kah-Gash before leaving Earth behind. He then set out on the mission to find the Kah-Gash and defeat the demons once and for all.

Beranabus, Sharmilla, Kernel, Dervish and Bec arrive on a boat, a luxury cruise liner which is covered in the bodies of the death. They then discover that the ship is encased within a bubble of magic, akin to Slawter, which allows Sharmila's artificial legs and Dervish's heart to work. Leaving Kernel behind to guard the window, the others proceed to the lower decks. Here they find the professional Disciple spy Kirilli Kovacs who explains how he had been tracking two mages that were working for somebody else and waiting for orders on when to open the window. When it was opened the demons came through and tortured and slaughtered everyone, then Juni repaid them by killing them and bathing in their remains. They are now convinced it is a trap for them but Beranabus tells them they are in the endgame now and have to proceed. They make it to the bottom deck where Juni is waiting for them smugly, about the fact she was right they would walk willingly into this trap. Lord Loss then talks to them through Cadaver and offers them the chance to join him, they refuse and tells them that Bec is all they want. They refuse again and Cadaver is sacrificed to open the lodestone again and the shadow, a tentacled monster with no face comes through. Which does the impossible as it raises all the death across the ship. It goes after Bec and as the others fight the zombies, it catches her and she learns its true nature. She relays this by magic to Beranabus who turns into his full demon form in order to fight it and break the lodestone. When he succeeds, the Shadow is sucked back but before it is gone it pierces Beranabus's brain several times killing him. They others then try to escape and after finally reaching the top deck after fighting hordes of zombies, they make it towards Kernel, but something goes wrong and after a huge explosion Kernel and the portal have disappeared. They then realize the bubble is still around the ship. They are unable to leave Sharmilla who has lost her temporary legs, who tells them to sacrifice her to burst through the bubble. They do this and Bec takes Kirilli's magic to free a lifeboat and send it to the hole, created by Sharmilla's sacrifice. The three of them, Dervish, Kirilli and Bec have escaped, but they are on a lifeboat in the middle of the ocean with only a few bottles of water, no food and a first aid kit, doomed to watch the cruise liner slowly sink beneath the waves. Then Bec reveals to them the true nature of the Shadow. It is a force of the universe that gained consciousness from Bec's contradictory return from it - the force that gained consciousness is the inescapable, the grim reaper - the shadow is "Death" itself.

References

External links

 Official Darren Shan Site
 Official Darren Shan Blog
 Demonata website

2008 novels
Demon novels
The Demonata novels
HarperCollins books